Tamara Witmer (born March 21, 1984) is an American model, actress and reality television star. She is best known for her appearance as Playboy's Playmate of the Month, Miss August 2005, the cover girl for the October 2006 issue and appeared as Miss May in the Playboy Playmate Video Calendar of 2007.

Modeling career
Prior to becoming a Playmate, she has appeared on magazine covers (such as Muscle and Fitness, FHM and Glamour) as well as inside the issues of Maxim, Stuff, Vanity Fair and Sports Illustrated. Witmer has also appeared in advertising campaigns, calendars, lingerie and swimwear catalogs. She also appeared in Lingerie Bowl 2005 in February 2005 during half-time of Super Bowl XXXIX, as a lingerie-wearing tackle football player of the Los Angeles Temptation team.

In addition, she was the cover model for the March 2010 digital issue of Fast Lane magazine.

Filmography

Reality television
In 2007, Witmer was a contestant on first season of VH1's reality dating show Rock of Love. Although she made it into the house, she exited after the second episode along with three other contestants. She later returned for both the special Clip and Reunion episodes after the completion of the first season.

In 2009, Witmer was a contestant on the second season of the VH1 competition show I Love Money. She appeared in only the first episode, after losing an arm wrestling match.

Music video appearances
According to her now-defunct website, Witmer has made guest appearances in two music videos:

References

External links

 

1984 births
Living people
Legends Football League players
People from Dublin, Ohio
People from Valencia, Santa Clarita, California
2000s Playboy Playmates